The Musée Bouchard was a studio museum dedicated to sculptor Henri Bouchard (1875-1960), and located at 25, rue de l'Yvette, Paris, France.

The museum was established in Bouchard's studio after his death in 1960, and open to the public from 1962 to 2007. Its collections, including a large figure of Apollo displayed at the Palais de Chaillot, plus over a thousand other works such as bronze casts, stone sculptures, and original plaster works, have subsequently been transferred to the Musée de La Piscine in Roubaix. According to the museum's web site, a reconstruction of the studio was scheduled to open in 2010.

See also 
 List of museums in Paris

References 
 Musée Bouchard
 Henri Bouchard sculpteur 1875-1960
 Paris.org description

Defunct museums in Paris
Museums disestablished in 2007